Annika Bruhn (born 5 October 1992) is a German swimmer. She competed at the 2012 Summer Olympics. At the 2016 Summer Olympics in Rio de Janeiro, she competed in the women's 200 metre freestyle, finishing 20th in the heats and failing to qualify for the semifinals. She was a member of the women's 4 x 200 metre freestyle relay team which finished 12th in the heats and did not qualify for the final. She was also a member of the women's 4 × 100 m medley relay team which finished 12th in the heats and did not qualify for the final.

References

External links 
 
 

Living people
Swimmers at the 2012 Summer Olympics
Swimmers at the 2016 Summer Olympics
Olympic swimmers of Germany
German female swimmers
German female freestyle swimmers
Sportspeople from Karlsruhe
1992 births
World Aquatics Championships medalists in swimming
European Aquatics Championships medalists in swimming
Swimmers at the 2020 Summer Olympics
20th-century German women
21st-century German women